Marion is a town in Union Parish, Louisiana, United States. The population was 765 at the 2010 census, a decrease from 806 at the 2000 census. This population includes the village of Truxno in the northwestern corner of the city limits. It is part of the Monroe Metropolitan Statistical Area.

History
The town was named for Francis Marion, a military leader known as the "Swamp Fox".

Geography

Demographics

2020 census

As of the 2020 United States census, there were 623 people, 294 households, and 211 families residing in the town.

2000 census
As of the census of 2000, there were 806 people, 326 households, and 217 families residing in the town. The racial makeup of the town was 44.79% White, 54.09% African American, 0.12% Native American, 0.12% Pacific Islander, 0.12% from other races, and 0.74% from two or more races. Hispanic or Latino of any race were 0.99% of the population.

There were 326 households. Of which, 28.5% had children under the age of 18 living with them, 43.9% were married couples living together, 18.4% had a female householder with no husband present, and 33.4% were non-families. Additionally, 30.4% of all households were made up of individuals, and 14.4% had someone living alone who was 65 years of age or older. The average household size was 2.47, and the average family size was 3.13.

In the town, the population was spread out, with 29.3% under the age of 18, 8.8% from 18 to 24, 23.8% from 25 to 44, 24.2% from 45 to 64, and 13.9% who were 65 years of age or older. The median age was 35 years. For every 100 females, there were 85.7 males. For every 100 females age 18 and over, there were 83.9 males.

The median income for a household in the town was $22,417, and the median income for a family was $25,962. Males had a median income of $25,313 versus $13,125 for females. The per capita income for the town was $10,119. About 20.8% of families and 24.5% of the population were below the poverty line, including 33.3% of those under age 18 and 15.9% of those age 65 or over.

Education
Residents were assigned to Union Parish Public Schools' Marion High School (K-12) until June 2013, when the school closed down due to a lack of students in the 2012–13 school year. Marion students since the 2013–14 academic season go to the Union Parish High School located in Farmerville, Louisiana.

Notable people
 John David Crow, Heisman Trophy Winner, 1957; born in Marion, 1935
 Walt Goldsby (1861–1914), 19th century baseball player, born in Marion

See also
 LA 143

References

External links
Town of Marion
Marion Progress Community Progress Site for Marion, LA

Towns in Monroe, Louisiana metropolitan area
Towns in Louisiana
Towns in Union Parish, Louisiana